Frederick Davis was an Australian politician. He was a member of the Western Australian Legislative Council representing the Suburban Province from his election on 2 November 1911 until the end of his term in 1914. Davis was a member of the Labor Party.

References 

Members of the Western Australian Legislative Council
20th-century Australian politicians